Si-An Deng (born June 25, 1963 in Shanghai, People's Republic of China is a retired female badminton player from Canada.

Deng won the silver medal in the inaugural women's singles competition at the 1995 Pan American Games. She also claimed gold at that same tournament in the women's doubles. A resident of Vancouver, British Columbia, she represented Canada at the 1996 Summer Olympics in Atlanta, Georgia.

References
 Canadian Olympic Committee

1963 births
Living people
Sportspeople from Vancouver
Badminton players from Shanghai
Canadian sportspeople of Chinese descent
Canadian female badminton players
Chinese female badminton players
Badminton players at the 1996 Summer Olympics
Olympic badminton players of Canada
Badminton players at the 1995 Pan American Games
Pan American Games gold medalists for Canada
Pan American Games silver medalists for Canada
Pan American Games medalists in badminton
Commonwealth Games medallists in badminton
Commonwealth Games silver medallists for Canada
Commonwealth Games bronze medallists for Canada
Badminton players at the 1994 Commonwealth Games
Medalists at the 1995 Pan American Games
Medallists at the 1994 Commonwealth Games